"Cold (But I'm Still Here)" is the first single off Evans Blue's debut album, The Melody and the Energetic Nature of Volume. The song was released December 13, 2005, two months prior to the album release, and garnered frequent radio play in anticipation of the upcoming album. Evans Blue's official MySpace, explains the meaning of this song as well as others by the group. A music video was also produced for "Cold (But I'm Still Here)." The song currently has over three million plays on MySpace.

On April 28, 2006, The Edge released an exclusive acoustic version on their 2006 acoustic compilation album.

Track listing

Chart performance

References

External links
Official Evans Blue MySpace

2005 singles
Hollywood Records singles
Evans Blue songs
2005 songs